was a town located in Izumi District, Kagoshima Prefecture, Japan.

As of 2003, the town had an estimated population of 7,091 and the density of 99.77 persons per km². The total area was 71.07 km².

On March 20, 2006, Azuma was merged into the expanded town of Nagashima and no longer exists as an independent municipality.

External links
 Official website of Nagashima 

Dissolved municipalities of Kagoshima Prefecture